Colonno is a comune (municipality) in the Province of Como in the Italian region Lombardy, located about  north of Milan and about  northeast of Como. As of 31 December 2004, it had a population of 557 and an area of 5.7 km².

Colonno borders the following municipalities: Argegno, Laino, Lezzeno, Ossuccio, Pigra, Ponna, Sala Comacina.

Demographic evolution

References

Cities and towns in Lombardy